Playthings, also known as Little Toys, is a 1933 silent film directed by filmmaker Sun Yu. It is one of two films Sun Yu directed in 1933 (the other being Daybreak). The film stars popular Chinese actress Ruan Lingyu, and was produced by the leftist film production company, Lianhua Film Company. The story follows a village toy-maker, Sister Ye, who urges a group of villagers to continue making traditional playthings despite immense competition from foreign toy factories. Synonymous to many other films made during the same time period, Playthings is a patriotic propaganda film that expresses skepticism towards China's rapid urbanization and industrialization.

Made after Japan's invasion of China, Little Toys is a "Marxist war melodrama, containing strong nationalist sentiment yet reflecting Western influences."  Today, the film is recognized as one of the best Chinese films of the 20th century.

Cast 
Ruan Lingyu as Sister Ye, the main character and a skilled maker of traditional toys. She is the creative mind who leads the village of toy-makers to fight alongside the Chinese Nationalist Army.
Liu Jiqun as Sister Ye's husband, Old Ye, who dies under mysterious circumstances. 
Li Lili as Ye's daughter, Zhu'er (Pearly), who grows up to become a talented toy-maker. She dies in a Japanese attack.
Yuan Congmei as Mr. Yuan, Sister Ye's love interest. Although they separate at the beginning of the film, they find each other again on the busy streets of Shanghai at the end of the film.
Luo Peng as A Yong, Pearly's love interest. He loses his life in a Japanese attack.
Han Langen as Mantis, a toy-maker and villager.
Tang Tianxiu as the wealthy adoptive mother of Sister Ye's abducted son, Yu'er (Jade).

Plot 
The story is set during the early 1920s and begins with Sister Ye, a traditional toy-maker, who lives in a rural village with her husband and two children, Zhu'er (Pearly) and Yu'er (Jade). Sister Ye is considered the creative mind behind inventing new toys, and all the villagers look up to her. Her husband, Old Ye, assists by selling the toys out on the street, but one day has a heart attack and dies in Sister Ye's arms. Amidst the commotion, their toddler son Yu'er is kidnapped and sold to a wealthy lady in Shanghai. Shortly after, the village is destroyed during an attack between rival warlords, forcing the villagers to move to the city, where they continue to make toys.

Ten years pass, and Sister Ye's daughter, Zhu'er, is now 17 years old. She has become a toy designer like her mother. War has befallen the nation, and the villagers' attempts at patriotism bring them to early deaths. While helping the Nationalist army at the rear, Zhu'er is killed in an attack by the Japanese.

On Chinese New Year's Eve, the now-ragged Sister Ye, sits on a curb, selling toys. A young boy approaches her to buy a toy; he is none other than her son, whom she does not recognize. Firecrackers go off and Sister Ye mistakes the popping for the sound of gunfire. She proceeds to cause a stir, warning the people around her. As she continues to cause alarm, raving to the citizens on Nanjing Road to fight against the Japanese, they begin to listen, applauding as they realize she is right.

Background
Sun Yu was a producer, director, screenwriter, and actor for Lianhua Productions, a studio established by the producers Luo Mingyou and Li Minwei. Sun Yu was known to incorporate political messages within his films.

After China's New Culture Movement in the 1910s, the use and educational purposes of toys were redefined. Toys were seen as objects that could turn a child into a healthy individual. However, if the toys were in peculiar shapes, it would lead a child down the path of deviance instead.

In the early 1930s, China was in conflict with Japan and in a state of economic decline. On September 18, 1931, known as the Mukden Incident, Japanese framed the Chinese for an explosion of a rail line in northern China. This incident marked aggression between China and Japan. In addition, the January 28 incident occurred due to Japan retaliating for anti-Japanese propaganda. Playthings was filmed in late spring of 1933 and released on the eve of National Day, which pays tribute to the soldiers who fought in these conflicts.

Themes
Sister Ye is placed in the broad background of society, amidst the proliferation of industrialized goods, infighting of the warlords, social turmoil, and Japanese imperialism. Her peaceful life is disturbed by the destruction of her village and the difficulty of making her living amidst competition. The male characters of the film "offer a view to the problematic nature of both China's 'traditional' past and the moral complexities of a more international and industrialized future society."

However, Ye never loses confidence even as her husband falls ill and her son goes missing. Ye conforms to the "fallen woman" trope as she loses her daughter, screaming out "save China." Ye's beauty that the viewer has come to know is juxtaposed with her gradual descent into desperation and sadness.

Playthings is similar to the works by Sun Yu in the 1930s, featuring various bouts of passion. The film describes the unsuspecting and peaceful life of the villagers and the kindness of Ye. The genre of the film could be considered a tragedy given the circumstances that Ye finds herself in at the climax of the film. The film demonstrates the struggle of working women amidst a changing society and anti-Japanese sentiments in China.

According to Fernsebner, "despite its grim and desperate ending, 'Little Playthings' provided some essential tools for the job: a nostalgic sense of Chinese community and  cultural identity located in this object, the toy, as well as an implicit, simultaneous critique of both the 'old society' and the Western forces (industrial and imperialist) which imperiled the Chinese nation." The film not only served as an anti-Japanese propaganda, but also helped depict women as kindhearted and hard-working.

Contemporary reception
Produced during the Golden Age of Chinese cinema, among Sun Yu's other prominent works, Playthings has been regarded by contemporary critics and scholars as a classic film of notable cultural significance. Its focus on hardship, perseverance, patriotism, and resourcefulness portrayed by actress Ruan Lingyu helped progress the development of the "New Woman" archetype; a conceptualization that itself continued to gain prominence throughout 1930s-era Chinese discourse.

This film, among others produced by the Lianhua film company, is viewed by scholars as a significant component of the leftist film movement; notable for their focus on class struggle, nationalism, and the interplay between masculinity and femininity.

In 2005, the Hong Kong Film Awards ranked Playthings 70th overall on their list of best films within "the past 100 years of Chinese cinema."

Music 
Playthings is a silent film. In 2003, Singaporean composer Mark Chan, in a project co-commissioned by the Hong Kong Arts Festival and the Singapore Arts Festival, scored the silent film, and productions were staged in each country, featuring live music accompanying a screening of the film. The production was again re-staged in Copenhagen in 2005 and in the Shanghai International Arts Festival in 2007. Chan's score combines both Western instruments, like the piano or cello, and traditional Chinese instruments, like the erhu and the gaohu. The 2007 production was staged in the Shanghai Concert Hall on November 2, 2007.

English translations
Devoid of context, the original title of the film (Chinese: 小玩意; Pinyin: Xiǎo wányì) translates to English as "little things." The leading English title – Playthings – is a more ontologically inductive conceptualization of the word "play". This is reflective of the developmental role such devices serve in childhood upbringing and the formation of national identity. In contemporary analyses of the film, the toys themselves facilitate "a nostalgic sense of Chinese community" in addition to serving as the backdrop for the antagonistic relationship between "'old society' and Western forces."

An English-subtitled copy of the film uploaded by the Chinese Film Classics Project is available for public viewing on YouTube.

Further reading
 Andrew F. Jones, Developmental Fairy Tales: Evolutionary Thinking and Modern Chinese Culture. Harvard University Press, 2011.

References

External links
 Chinese Film Classics: Playthings (1933) with English subtitles

 Little Toys at the Chinese Movie Database
 Hear an excerpt of Mark Chan's new score for the silent film at http://www.markchan.com/home/song%20files/Internet%20Little%20Toys.mp3

1933 films
Chinese silent films
Chinese drama films
1933 drama films
Films set in Shanghai
Films directed by Sun Yu
Lianhua Film Company films
Chinese black-and-white films
Silent drama films